Boyd Field was a stadium in Norman, Oklahoma that hosted the University of Oklahoma Sooners football team from 1905 until they moved to Oklahoma Memorial Stadium in 1923.  The stadium held 11,000 people at its peak and was opened in 1905.  The stadium was named after former university president, David Ross Boyd.

References

External links
 Stadium information

Defunct college football venues
Oklahoma Sooners football
University of Oklahoma campus
Defunct sports venues in Oklahoma